Santa Maria del Suffragio is a Neoclassic style,  Roman Catholic chapel in the main cemetery of Piacenza, Italy. It was completed in 1826, with a Greek cross layout and a sober portico, by Lotario Tomba. The interior dome and pendentives were frescoed in 1936 by the painter Luciano Ricchetti. It houses an Immaculate Conception with Saints Francis and Anthony by Camillo Procaccini.

References

Roman Catholic churches in Piacenza
Roman Catholic churches completed in 1826
Neoclassical architecture in Emilia-Romagna
1826 establishments in Italy
Roman Catholic chapels in Italy
19th-century Roman Catholic church buildings in Italy
Neoclassical church buildings in Italy